Myopsyche idda is a moth of the  subfamily Arctiinae. It was described by Plötz in 1880. It is found in Cameroon.

References

 Natural History Museum Lepidoptera generic names catalog

Endemic fauna of Cameroon
Arctiinae
Moths described in 1880